Susan Cooper (born 1935) is a British author of children's books.

Susan Cooper is also the name of:

Susan Cooper (swimmer) (born 1963), British Olympic swimmer
Susan Cooper (physicist), professor of experimental physics at Oxford University
Susan Fenimore Cooper (1813–1894), writer
Susan Rogers Cooper (born 1947), American mystery novelist

See also
Susie Cooper, English ceramic designer